Ponnuswamy Rangaswamy (born 13 August 1964) is an Indian weightlifter. He competed in the men's bantamweight event at the 1992 Summer Olympics.

References

1964 births
Living people
Indian male weightlifters
Olympic weightlifters of India
Weightlifters at the 1992 Summer Olympics
Place of birth missing (living people)
Commonwealth Games medallists in weightlifting
Commonwealth Games gold medallists for India
Weightlifters at the 1990 Commonwealth Games
20th-century Indian people
21st-century Indian people
Medallists at the 1990 Commonwealth Games